Blanca Ximena Aliaga Vargas (born 3 February 1995) is a Bolivian footballer who plays as a goalkeeper. She has been a member of the Bolivia women's national team.

Early life
Aliaga hails from the Santa Cruz Department.

International career
Aliaga played for Bolivia at senior level in the 2014 Copa América Femenina.

References

1995 births
Living people
Women's association football goalkeepers
Bolivian women's footballers
People from Santa Cruz Department (Bolivia)
Bolivia women's international footballers